Thiago Alves Ponciano (born 8 May 1994) is a Brazilian handball player for Ciudad Encantada and the Brazilian national team.

He participated at the 2017 World Men's Handball Championship.

References

1994 births
Living people
People from Foz do Iguaçu
Brazilian male handball players
Expatriate handball players
Brazilian expatriate sportspeople in Spain
Liga ASOBAL players
South American Games gold medalists for Brazil
South American Games medalists in handball
Competitors at the 2018 South American Games
Pan American Games medalists in handball
Pan American Games bronze medalists for Brazil
Handball players at the 2019 Pan American Games
Medalists at the 2019 Pan American Games
Handball players at the 2020 Summer Olympics
Sportspeople from Paraná (state)
21st-century Brazilian people